Caretene (born c. 456 — died September 16, 506) was the wife of Gundobad, king of the Burgundians. Unlike her husband, who was an Arian, Caretene was a Catholic. She was probably the mother of Sigismund of Burgundy.

Epitaph

Sources
 Martina Hartmann: Die Königin im frühen Mittelalter. Kohlhammer Verlag, Stuttgart 2009, S. 3f.; 11; 148; 159; 167f.; 206; 215.
 Reinhold Kaiser: Die Burgunder. Kohlhammer Verlag, Stuttgart 2004, S. 63; 118; 124; 152; 154; 159; 167.
 Gerd Kampers: Caretena – Königin und Asketin. Mosaiksteine zum Bild einer burgundischen Herrscherin, in: Francia 27, 1 (2000), S. 1–32.
 John Robert Martindale u. a.: The Prosopography of the Later Roman Empire (PRLE), Bd. 2, 1980, S. 260f.

References

5th-century Germanic people
6th-century Germanic people
506 deaths
Year of birth unknown
Burgundian queens consort
5th-century women
6th-century women